Personal Information Protection Commission may refer to:
 Personal Information Protection Commission (Japan)
 Personal Information Protection Commission (South Korea)